Dicrateria is a genus of haptophytes, comprising the three species Dicrateria gilva, Dicrateria inornata, and Dicrateria vlkianum.

References

Haptophyte genera